Holy Trinity Catholic High School is a Catholic secondary school in Bradford, Ontario, Canada. It is one of the two high schools located in Bradford, the other being Bradford District High School. It was established in 1985, at which time the school was spread over several buildings in Bradford. In January 1986, a new site was found in a building on the third floor of Bradford's Bank of Nova Scotia building, which meant Holy Trinity then had four classrooms in one building.

In September 1986, the school moved to portable classroom buildings at its current site. Construction of the current school building did not begin until 1991, and the building's official opening was 24 May 1992.

References 

 Catholic secondary schools in Ontario